San Pedro Pinula is a town and municipality in the Jalapa department of Guatemala. There is a cathedral in the town.

References

Municipalities of the Jalapa Department